Aidan Healy is a hurler from Co. Kerry. He plays with Kerry and Abbeydorney. He won a Christy Ring Cup All Star in 2006. He was part of the Abbeydorney team that made it to the 2005 Kerry Senior Hurling Championship but lost out after a re-play to Lixnaw

External links
http://www.sportsfile.com/id/RP0031422/
http://www.sportsfile.com/id/358047/

Kerry inter-county hurlers
Abbeydorney hurlers
Living people
Year of birth missing (living people)